The following is a list of fictional astronauts on missions to deflect asteroids and comets which pose a threat to Earth, as well as performing other miscellaneous feats of space exploration not yet achieved.

Asteroid/comet deflection

Other

Notes

See also
List of fictional astronauts (exploration of outer Solar System)

References

Lists of fictional astronauts